Lakmeh Sar (also Romanized as Lākmeh Sar) is a village in Rudboneh Rural District, Rudboneh District, Lahijan County, Gilan Province, Iran. At the 2006 census, its population was 564, in 172 families.

References 

Populated places in Lahijan County